Seung Hee Yang (born November 17, 1969) is a South Korean violinist and academic. She is a violin professor at Chugye University for the Arts and has performed internationally.

Born in Seoul, South Korea, she initially learned to play the piano before taking up the violin at the age of 6. She graduated from the Yewon Art School, Seoul Arts High School, and achieved the Bachelor of Music at the Seoul National University studying with Jong-sook Lee. She studied at the Salzburg Mozarteum for the Master of Music with Ruggiero Ricci in 1995, at Amsterdam Conservatory for the professional Performance certificate with Victor Liberman in 1998 and at Rutgers University for the Doctor of Musical Arts with Arnold Steinhardt in 2002.

Awards
Winner of the 30th Dong-A music competition (1990, South Korea)
Winner of Rutgers University concerto competition
Winner of Artists International annual New York debut audition (2000, USA)

Career
Performance
Orchestral: CIS Collegium Musicum string orchestra (Mozarteum University of Salzburg), Rutgers University Orchestra, KBS Symphony Orchestra, Bucheon Philharmonic Orchestra, Korean Chamber Orchestra, Wonju Philharmonic Orchestra, Seoul Classical Players, Seoul City Chamber Orchestra, Seoul Music Academy Orchestra, Collegium Musicum of Seoul National University
Solo performances at music festivals and conferences: Holland Music Session, Gradus Music Festival in Spain, Bowdoin Music Festival in U.S.A, National Conference of Music of College Music Society in Canada, Carl Flesch Academy in Germany

Orchestra leadership
2005-2011 Associate concertmaster of Bucheon Philharmonic Orchestra
2014–present Concertmaster of Seoul Academy Ensemble
Teaching and research
1994 Ruggiero Ricci's research assistant at the Salzburg Summer Academy
1998 Research assistant at Rutgers University
2000-2001 Factulty of Rutgers Community Music Program
2003-2005 Assistant professor at State University of New York at Oswego
2011 An adjunct professor at Ewha Womans University
2012 Artist/Professor at Atlantic Music Festival
2013–present Professor at Chugye University for the Arts

References

Year of birth missing (living people)
Living people
South Korean violinists
Seoul National University alumni
Rutgers University alumni
21st-century violinists